The United States Air Force Academy, Cadet Area is a portion of the United States Air Force Academy in Colorado Springs, Colorado.   modern architecture stands in contrast with the very traditional designs of West Point and the United States Naval Academy.   designated a National Historic Landmark District 

The buildings in the Cadet Area were designed in a distinct, modernist style, and make extensive use of aluminum on building exteriors, suggesting the outer skin of aircraft or spacecraft.

The Terrazzo

The main buildings in the Cadet Area are set around a large, square pavilion known as  The name comes from the fact that the walkways are made of terrazzo tiles, set among a checkerboard of marble strips. The Terrazzo area was designed by landscape architect 

The center of the Cadet Area was originally a wooded, sloping hill that extended from the middle of the Terrazzo south to the valley below, creating a blend of natural and man-made environments. With the building of Sijan Hall on the south side of the Terrazzo in 1968, the Terrazzo area was effectively enclosed into a large quadrangle, and this natural part of the landscape was eliminated. Only the top of the hill, now known as "Spirit Hill", remains in the central grassy area of the Terrazzo.

Cadet Chapel

The most recognizable building in the Cadet Area is the 17-spired Cadet Chapel. The subject of controversy when built, it is now considered among the most beautiful examples of modern American academic architecture. The structure consists of 100 identical aluminum tetrahedrons, with colored glass in the spaces between the tetrahedrons.

Architect Walter Netsch said he was inspired in his design by the Sainte-Chapelle cathedral in Paris, the Cathedral of Chartres and the Basilica of San Francesco d'Assisi   the upper portion houses a  multi-denomination Protestant chapel; downstairs are a  Catholic chapel, a  Jewish chapel, and interfaith rooms used for services of other religions.

Dormitories
Cadets live in two dormitories, Vandenberg Hall and Sijan Hall. The former is the original dormitory and honors General  the Chief of Staff of the Air Force from 1948 to 1953. Sijan Hall was built on the south side of the Cadet Area in 1968, in order to accommodate the expansion of the Cadet Wing to a strength of 4,417 cadets. Known simply as the "New Dorm" until its dedication on May 31, 1976, it was named after Captain Lance Sijan '65, the first USAFA graduate to be awarded the

Academic buildings

Several buildings in the Cadet Area are used for academics. Fairchild Hall, named after General Muir S. Fairchild, the first commander of Air University and later Vice Chief of Staff of the Air Force, is the main academic building. Fairchild Hall houses academic classrooms, laboratories, research facilities, faculty offices. The Robert F. McDermott Library is a separate building.

The Aeronautics Research Center (also known as the "Aero Lab") is just south of Fairchild Hall and contains numerous aeronautical research facilities, including transonic, subsonic, low speed and cascade wind tunnels, engine and rocket test cells 

The Consolidated Education and Training Facility (CETF) was built in 1997 as an annex to Fairchild Hall. It contains chemistry and biology classrooms and labs, medical and dental clinics and civil engineering and astronautics laboratories. The Cadet Area also contains an observatory and a planetarium for academic use.

Dining and entertainment facilities

Mitchell Hall, named after air power pioneer Brigadier General William "Billy" Mitchell, is the cadet dining facility, which has the ability to feed the entire Cadet Wing at one time.

The cadet social center is Arnold Hall, named after General of the Air Force Henry H. "Hap" Arnold, commanding general of the U.S. Army Air Forces during World War II. Arnold Hall is located just outside the Cadet Area and houses a 3,000-seat theater, ballroom, and a number of lounge and recreation facilities for cadets and visitors.

Administration building
Harmon Hall is the primary administration building, which houses the offices of the Superintendent and supporting staff. It is named after Lieutenant General Hubert R. Harmon, the academy's first superintendent

Sports facilities
The Cadet Area also contains extensive facilities for use by cadets participating in intercollegiate athletics, intramural athletics, physical education classes and other physical training. Set amid numerous outdoor athletic fields, the Cadet Gymnasium contains basketball gyms, indoor tennis courts, an Olympic-size swimming and diving pool, a water polo pool, numerous squash and racquetball courts, two weight-training rooms with state-of-the-art equipment and specialized facilities for volleyball, fencing, gymnastics, boxing, and the rifle team. The gymnasium also houses a human performance laboratory complete with hydrostatic weighing equipment, sports psychology and vision testing capabilities and aerobic testing equipment, including an elevation chamber.

The Cadet Fieldhouse contains the 6,000-seat Clune Arena (named after long-time USAFA Director of Athletics Colonel John J. Clune ), a 2,600-seat ice hockey rink and an indoor track that doubles as a practice facility for a number of sports throughout the year. ''

See also
List of National Historic Landmarks in Colorado
National Register of Historic Places listings in El Paso County, Colorado

References

External links
Official United States Air Force Academy website

Cadet Area
Buildings and structures in Colorado Springs, Colorado
Economy of Colorado Springs, Colorado
National Historic Landmarks in Colorado
National Historic Landmark Districts
Military facilities on the National Register of Historic Places in Colorado
National Register of Historic Places in Colorado Springs, Colorado
Historic districts in Colorado
Tourist attractions in Colorado Springs, Colorado
Skidmore, Owings & Merrill buildings
1950s architecture in the United States
Modernist architecture in Colorado